KWIQ (1020 AM) is a radio station  broadcasting a sports format to the Moses Lake, Washington, United States, area.  The station is owned by Alpha Media LLC and features programming from ESPN Radio.

During daytime broadcast hours, the station's antenna system uses two towers arranged in a directional array that concentrates the signal toward the northeast. At nighttime, only one of the towers is used, resulting in an omnidirectional pattern. The transmitter and antenna array are located on the west side of Moses Lake near N Westshore Drive.

References

External links

WIQ
Sports radio stations in the United States
Mass media in Grant County, Washington
Radio stations established in 1995
Alpha Media radio stations